Sauce de Portezuelo is a resort (balneario) in the Maldonado Department of Uruguay.

Geography
To the east it borders the resort Ocean Park and to the north the resort La Capuera, which is on the coast of Laguna del Sauce. Ruta Interbalnearia, also marked as Route 93 for this area, separates it from the later.

Places of interest

Portezuelo was the location chosen by Spanish architect and designer Antoni Bonet i Castellana to build one of his most famous buildings, Solana del Mar. He also planned the layout of the seaside resort.

Population
In 2011 Sauce de Portezuelo had a population of 128 permanent inhabitants and 173 dwellings.
 
Source: Instituto Nacional de Estadística de Uruguay

References

External links
INE map of Sauce de Portezuelo, Ocean Park, Chihuahua and La Capuera

Populated places in the Maldonado Department
Seaside resorts in Uruguay